The Granite Curling Club (also known as The Granite), located in Winnipeg, Manitoba, is the oldest curling club in western Canada.

Affectionately known to curling fans as the "Mother Club", it has produced many Canadian and world champions. It is often considered to be the "St. Andrews" of curling because of its contribution to the sport in curling's most dominant region.

History 
The original Granite Curling Club dates back to 1880. Its current downtown location and Tudor-framed clubhouse was built in 1913, and the building has since been designated as a Winnipeg Heritage Building.

One of the early presidents was John B. Mather, who assumed that position in 1887.

Provincial champions

Notable members
Kate Cameron
 Jason Gunnlaugson
Leslie Wilson-Westcott
Raunora Westcott

References

External links

 Manitoba Historical Society
 Granite Curling Club, Winnipeg - Club website

Curling clubs established in 1880
Sports venues in Winnipeg
Curling clubs in Canada
1880 establishments in Manitoba
Curling in Winnipeg

Municipal Historical Resources of Winnipeg